The Knife River Bridge near Stanton, North Dakota, is a Pratt through-truss structure that was built in 1898.  It was listed on the National Register of Historic Places in 2001.

The bridge was damaged in the spring of 1997 and was threatened with demolition.  It was repaired and repainted for $126,400, and reopened for use in 1998.

References

Road bridges on the National Register of Historic Places in North Dakota
Bridges completed in 1898
National Register of Historic Places in Mercer County, North Dakota
Pratt truss bridges in the United States
1898 establishments in North Dakota
Transportation in Mercer County, North Dakota
Bridge